
Year 117 BC was a year of the pre-Julian Roman calendar. At the time it was known as the Year of the Consulship of Diadematus and Augur (or, less frequently, year 637 Ab urbe condita) and the Sixth Year of Yuanshou. The denomination 117 BC for this year has been used since the early medieval period, when the Anno Domini calendar era became the prevalent method in Europe for naming years.

Events

Births 
 Ptolemy XII Auletes, king (pharaoh) of  Egypt (d. 51 BC)

Deaths 
 Huo Qubing, Chinese general of the Han Dynasty (b. 140 BC)
 Sima Xiangru, Chinese statesman, poet, and musician (b. 179 BC)

References